Hudiksvall is a city and the seat of Hudiksvall Municipality, in Hälsingland, Gävleborg County, Sweden with 15,015 inhabitants in 2010. Hudiksvall is also known as Glada Hudik, a term that originated in the 19th century as word spread of its friendly hospitality and its lively social life. The city is located along the E4, on the east coast of Sweden deep inside the bay Hudiksvallsfjärden, about 80 km south of Sundsvall and about 130 km north of Gävle. Hudiksvall is Sweden's 76th largest urban area and also the largest urban area in Hälsingland. Around Hudiksvall within the municipality lay the communities of Delsbo, Iggesund, Enånger,  Njutånger, Näsviken and Sörforsa.

History 

Hudiksvall was founded by King John III of Sweden in 1582. He had the inhabitants moved from the town Hudik, where his father Gustav Vasa had collected the trade- and craftsmen of Hälsingland in order to more easily collect taxes, to Hudiksvall by the shores of the bay.

At the time, fishing and the trading of furs, skins, iron, copper and wood products were the main sources of income, and the city flourished. But the city lost its privileges for foreign trading in 1636, and its development was somewhat stalled for the next two centuries.

It has been damaged by fires some 10 times, the most severe when it was burnt by the Russians during the Russian Pillage of 1719-1721 in 1721, whereafter only the church remained. The current street structure was applied in 1792 as part of the reconstruction necessitated by another fire.

Climate 
Hudiksvall has a humid continental climate with a significant maritime influence. In the 1961-1990 reference period it was just above subarctic, but that border region has since moved somewhat further north. Considering how far north it is, the climate is comparatively mild, with warm summers and moderated winters with daytime highs often hovering around the freezing point. By east coast standards, Hudiksvall has a relatively wet climate with an annual precipitation rate averaging  sometimes resulting in heavy snowfall during winters.

Sport 
The city has three exercise trails on either side of the town: in the West, at Fridhem, in the North, just above the gymnasium, and in the East at Björkberg, of which the East has hosted the Svenska mästerskap in cross country skiing a few times, most recently January 2005. In the western part of town there is also a ski slope, Hede, and in the North lies the trotting track Hagmyren.

The city center features a swimming pool with a gym, a solarium and an indoor sports hall. In 1939 Glysisvallen was built to include a soccer field, stadium, running track and outdoor hockey rink. In 1989 Hudiksvall received their first indoor hockey hall in the area, and in 2007 an artificial soccer field was built at Glysisvallen. In 1999, Hudiksvall also received a large modern indoor sports hall in the former sawmill located in the industrial area Håstaholmen.

In addition, Hudiksvall have the sports club Strands IF, the football club ABK, the hockey club HHC and the floor hockey club Hudik/Björkberg. The most successful in recent years is the Hudiksvall sports club's ski section whose sprint skier Björn Lind won two Olympic gold medals in Turin in 2006. In the 2010 Winter Olympics in Vancouver Daniel Richardson won an Olympic gold medal in the team sprint. The 2010 Vasalopp was won by Jörgen Brink.

Buildings and structures
Outside of Hudiksvall in Forsa socken, the Storbergsmasten is located. Storbergsmasten is a 335 metre tall guyed mast for FM- and TV-transmission, which shares the first place as Sweden's tallest structure together with three other masts of same height.

Famous people from Hudiksvall
 Agneta Sjödin, presenter and TV-personality
 Brainbombs, noise rock band
 Gösta Skoglund, social democrat politician
 Hans Vestberg, businessman
 Noomi Rapace, actress
 Jenny Sjödin, professional wrestler and submission grappler
 Tomas Brolin, former football player
 Vildhjarta, Progressive metal/Djent band
 Totalitär, hardcore punk band
 Amy Gumenick, actress
 Coldbound, Black Metal/Doom Metal band
 Svante Stockselius, Eurovision/EBU
 Captain Lars Peter Hedlund,  mariner, explorer, and pearler

See also
Sjösmyrsjön

References 

Populated places in Hudiksvall Municipality
Hälsingland
Municipal seats of Gävleborg County
Swedish municipal seats
Coastal cities and towns in Sweden
Populated places established in 1582